Yoga Upanishads are a group of minor Upanishads of Hinduism related to Yoga. There are twenty Yoga Upanishads in the anthology of 108 Upanishads listed in the Muktika anthology. The Yoga Upanishads, along with other minor Upanishads, are generally classified separate from the thirteen major Principal Upanishads considered to be more ancient and from the Vedic tradition.

The Yoga Upanishads deal with the theory and practice of Yogic techniques, with varied emphasis on methodology and meditation, but with some shared ideas. They contrast from other groups of minor Upanishads, such as the Samanya Upanishads which are of a generic nature, the Sannyasa Upanishads which focus on the Hindu renunciation and monastic practice, the Shaiva Upanishads which highlight aspects of Shaivism, the Vaishnava Upanishads which highlight Vaishnavism, and the Shakta Upanishads which highlight Shaktism.

Date
The composition date of each Yoga Upanishad is unclear, and estimates on when they were composed vary among scholars. According to Mahony, they likely are dated between 100 BC and 1100 AD. However, Gavin Flood dates the Yoga Upanishads to the 100 BCE to 300 CE period. According to James Mallinson, some Yoga Upanishads were revised in the eighteenth century to incorporate the Hatha Yoga ideas of the Hindu Natha sub-tradition.

Mircea Eliade states that textual style, archaic language and the mention of some Yoga Upanishads in other Indian texts suggest the following Yoga Upanishads were likely composed in the same period as the didactic parts of the Mahabharata and the chief Sannyasa Upanishads: Brahmabindu (probably composed about the same time as Maitri Upanishad), Ksurika, Amritabindu, Brahmavidya, Tejobindu Upanishad, Nadabindu, Yogashikha, Dhyanabindu and Yogatattva. Eliade's suggestion places these in the final BCE centuries or early CE centuries. All these, adds Eliade, likely were composed earlier than the ten or eleven later Yoga Upanishads such as the Yoga-kundalini, Varaha and Pashupatabrahma Upanishads.

Scope
Yoga Upanishads discuss different aspects and kinds of Yoga, ranging from postures, breath exercises, meditation (dhyana), sound (nada), tantra (kundalini anatomy) and others. Some of these topics are not covered in the Bhagavad Gita or Patanjali's Yoga Sutras.

Many texts describe Yoga as consisting of steps or members (angas) and according to Paul Deussen, the important Yoga Upanishads which deal with these are the Brahmavidya, Kshurika, Culika (listed under the Samanya Upanishads),  Nadabindu, Brahmabindu, Amritabindu, Dhyanabindu, Tejobindu, Yogashika, Yogatattva, and Hamsa. These 11 Yoga Upanishads belong to the Vedic shakha (school) from the Vedantic point of view. They include discussion of ethics [ yama, (self restraints such as non-violence) and niyama, (self effort such as study) ], asana (physical exercises and body posture), pranayama (breath exercises), pratyahara (withdrawal of the senses), dharana (concentration of the mind), dhyana (contemplation and meditation) and samadhi (a state of meditative absorption-consciousness).

List of 20 Yoga Upanishads

See also
Hindu texts
Vedas

References

Bibliography